The canton of La Brède is an administrative division of the Gironde department, southwestern France. Its borders were not modified at the French canton reorganisation which came into effect in March 2015. Its seat is in La Brède.

It consists of the following communes:
 
Ayguemorte-les-Graves
Beautiran
La Brède
Cabanac-et-Villagrains
Cadaujac
Castres-Gironde
Isle-Saint-Georges
Léognan
Martillac
Saint-Médard-d'Eyrans
Saint-Morillon
Saint-Selve
Saucats

References

Cantons of Gironde